Tettigidea acuta, the acute pygmy grasshopper, is a species of pygmy grasshopper in the family Tetrigidae. It is found in North America.

References

Further reading

 
 

Tetrigidae
Insects described in 1895